Let's Celebrate 2002–2012 is a compilation album by the Melody Club, celebrating their 10-year anniversary. The album features their top singles plus two new songs, namely 'Paralyzed' and 'Crossfire'. It was released 28 November 2012.

Track listing

Chart positions

References

2012 greatest hits albums
Compilation albums by Swedish artists
Melody Club albums